Piacenza Calcio once again survived in Serie A, this time being on the brink of relegation, and having to beat Cagliari in Naples in a so-called spareggio to decide which team would stay up. Thanks to a 3–1 victory, Piacenza was able to hang onto their Serie A status, which was all that could be expected from new coach Bortolo Mutti. Despite losing Nicola Caccia to Napoli, Piacenza was able to count on a reliable goal scorer in Pasquale Luiso, who grabbed 14 goals in his debut season in Serie A.

Astonishingly, Piacenza lost just one match at home all season, but instead won no matches on away turf, having won just once in 51 Serie A matches outside the home ground.

Squad

Goalkeepers
  Massimo Taibi
  Sergio Marcon

Defenders
  Massimo Brioschi
  Mirko Conte
  Daniele Cozzi
  Daniele Delli Carri
  Settimio Lucci
  Stefano Maccoppi
  Fausto Pari
  Cleto Polonia
  Simone Corradi
  Alessandro Lucarelli
  Andrea Tagliaferri

Midfielders
  Eusebio Di Francesco
  Luca Matteassi
  Daniele Moretti
  Gabriele Pin
  Giuseppe Scienza
  Aladino Valoti
  Paolo Tramezzani
  Gianpietro Piovani
  Fabian Valtolina
  Carlo Ballotta

Attackers
  Pasquale Luiso
  Andrea Tentoni
  Francesco Zerbini
  Gabriele Ballotta

Serie A

League table

Position by round

Matches

Relegation tie-breaker

Cagliari relegated to 1997–98 Serie B.

Top scorers
  Pasquale Luiso 14 (3)
  Giuseppe Scienza 4
  Eusebio Di Francesco 3
  Gianpietro Piovani 2

References

Sources
RSSSF - Italy Championship 1996/97

Piacenza Calcio 1919 seasons
Piacenza